Scot Z. Matayoshi is an American attorney and politician serving as a member of the Hawaii House of Representatives from the 49th district. He assumed office on November 6, 2018.

Education 
Matayoshi earned a Bachelor of Arts degree in government from Claremont McKenna College, a Juris Doctor from the William S. Richardson School of Law, and a Master of Education from the University of Hawaiʻi at Mānoa.

Career 
Prior to entering politics, Matayoshi was an associate at McCorriston Miller Mukai Mackinnon and Schlack Ito in Honolulu. He was elected to the Hawaii House of Representatives in 2018, succeeding Ken Ito.

References 

Democratic Party members of the Hawaii House of Representatives
Claremont McKenna College alumni
University of Hawaiʻi at Mānoa alumni
Hawaii lawyers
Living people
Year of birth missing (living people)